Club Deportivo Tehuacán was a Salvadoran football club based in Tecoluca, El Salvador.

History
After winning the 2007 Clausura in the Salvadoran Third Division the team played the 2007/2008 season in the country's second tier. Before the 2009 Clausura season they merged with Independiente Nacional 1906 and then were renamed Independiente Tehuacán and were still allowed to play in the second division but disappeared after that.

Achievements
Salvadoran Third Division: 1
 2007 Clausura

Club

Rivalries
C.D. Tehuacán main rival was Platense. They are rivals since both clubs are only separated by 11 km.

Supporters
C.D. Tehuacán were mostly supported by the Tehuacan community, but also gained support and funding from the United States.

Notable coaches
 Iván "El Diablo" Ruiz (2007–2008)

References

Association football clubs established in 1928
Defunct football clubs in El Salvador
1928 establishments in El Salvador